Felistus Chitoshi (born 5 January 1997) is a Zambian long-distance runner. In 2019, she competed in the senior women's race at the 2019 IAAF World Cross Country Championships held in Aarhus, Denmark. She finished in 88th place.

References

External links 
 

Living people
1997 births
Place of birth missing (living people)
Zambian female long-distance runners
Zambian female cross country runners